is a railway station on the Soya Main Line in Horonobe, Teshio District, Hokkaido, Japan, operated by Hokkaido Railway Company (JR Hokkaido).

Lines
The station is numbered "W67".

Station layout
The station has a single side platform serving a single platform. The station is unstaffed.

Adjacent stations

History

The station opened on 1 April 1987.

In September 2016, JR Hokkaido announced that it intended to close the station along with two other unstaffed stations on the line ( and ) in March 2017, due to low passenger usage.

Passenger statistics
In fiscal 2015, the station was used on average by less than one passenger daily.

Surrounding area
 Teshio River

See also
 List of railway stations in Japan

References

External links

 JR Hokkaido station information 

Stations of Hokkaido Railway Company
Railway stations in Hokkaido Prefecture
Railway stations in Japan opened in 1987